Hannah Eliza Jane Brenkley (née Hopkins, 7 March 1882 – 25 February 1973) was a New Zealand artist and craftswoman. She created artworks through carving, needlework, and painting. Items of her work are in the permanent collections of the National Library of New Zealand, the Museum of New Zealand Te Papa Tongarewa and the Museum Theatre Gallery Hawke's Bay.

Biography 
Brenkley was born in Norsewood, Hawke's Bay, New Zealand. Her parents were Scandinavian and had immigrated on board the Hovding. When she was five years old, she started sketching; a family member gave her a paint set and she began to paint in watercolours. She never formally studied art or painting, but became a sought-after artist of landscapes, flowers and herbs. 

Brenkley was also a wood carver and produced domestic items such as tables, fire screens, umbrella stands, bookends, paperknives, breadboards, decorated boxes and eggcups. These were created with a pocketknife and paintbrush. Brenkley admired Māori culture and many of her items feature artistic elements of Māori style, such as using pāua shell for the eyes of carved figures.

A piece of her wood carving work was displayed in the women's section of the New Zealand Centennial Exhibition in 1939.

Personal life 
When she was 18, she married sawmiller Thomas Brenkley. The couple lived most of their lives on their dairy farm in the Norsewood-Ormondville area and raised 10 children.

Legacy 
In 1999, the Hawke's Bay Cultural Trust staged a solo exhibition of Brenkley's work, entitled Jane Brenkley: a path through the bush.

References

1882 births
1973 deaths
20th-century New Zealand artists
New Zealand people of Scandinavian descent
People from Norsewood
20th-century New Zealand women artists
New Zealand woodcarvers
New Zealand women painters